Brian Bickell (born November 1954) is the chief executive of property firm Shaftesbury plc. He joined the firm in 1986 and became finance director in 1987.

References

1954 births
Living people
British LGBT businesspeople
English chief executives
English accountants
21st-century LGBT people